Kazimierz Wielki is a Polish historical film. It was released in 1975.

Cast 

 Krzysztof Chamiec – Kazimierz III Wielki
 Zofia Saretok – Cudka
 Władysław Hańcza – Jarosław Bogoria ze Skotnik
 Wiesław Gołas – Maćko Borkowic
 Ignacy Machowski – Władysław I Łokietek
 Tadeusz Fijewski – Nanker
 Piotr Pawłowski – Jan Grot
 Stefan Friedmann – Sulisław
 Barbara Wrzesińska – Elżbieta Łokietkówna
 Leon Niemczyk – Karol Robert
 Michał Pluciński – Jan Luksemburski
 Bolesław Płotnicki
 Eugeniusz Kamiński – Suchywilk
 Andrzej Szalawski – Olgierd
 Tomasz Neuman – Kazimierz IV (Kaźko Słupski)
 Paweł Unrug 
 Stanisław Niwiński – Dobrogost
 Zofia Sykulska-Szancerowa
 Zbigniew Jabłoński
 Remigiusz Rogacki
 Ahmed Hegazi – Tatars' commander
 Władysław Komar – Władzio
 Barbara Rachwalska 
 Wiesław Komasa - Dobiegniew
 Andrzej Szaciłło
 Zygmunt Wiaderny
 Stanisław Zatłoka
 Jerzy Kiszkis

References

External links

1975 films
Polish historical films
1970s Polish-language films
Films directed by Ewa Petelska
Films directed by Czesław Petelski
1970s historical films
Casimir III the Great